The Redlands Line is a former Pacific Electric interurban railway line in the Inland Empire. The route provided suburban service between San Bernardino and Redlands.

History
Constructed by the San Bernardino Valley Traction Company starting in 1902, the line began regular service on March 10, 1903. Cars initially operated into San Bernardino under trackage rights via the Redlands Street Railway until the two merged in June after opening. Cars initially terminated at Urbita Springs. The San Bernardino Valley Traction Company was absorbed into Pacific Electric under the Great Merger in 1911. By March 1913 the inbound terminus was changed from Urbita Springs to the San Bernardino station.

By January 1916 through-routing with the San Bernardino–Riverside Line had begun, forming the Redlands–Riverside Line. The line also supported heavy usage by freight trains transporting fruit. On November 1, 1920, through service was provided to Los Angeles for the first time, with Redlands cars appended to Upland–San Bernardino Line trains. The 2 hour 50 minute journey was the longest single service ever offered by the Pacific Electric. Between April and June 1928 through-routing was discontinued with the San Bernardino–Riverside Line as part of a scheme developed by the California Railroad Commission; this was reverted after proving unsuccessful. Service ended after July 19, 1936, leaving Redlands as the largest city in the Pacific Electric system served exclusively by buses.

References

Bibliography

External links
 Pacific Electric Ry. Co. Redlands 1911 Map

Pacific Electric routes
Light rail in California
Railway lines opened in 1903
1903 establishments in California
Railway lines closed in 1936
1936 disestablishments in California
Redlands, California
Closed railway lines in the United States